Narazeni (Georgian and ) is a village in the Zugdidi Municipality of Samegrelo-Zemo Svaneti region of western Georgia. Situated 17 km east of the city Zugdidi.

History
The village was on the transit route in the Silk Road period.

During the Soviet period, Narazeni was a farming village. There were tea plantations, fruit gardens, and mandarine plantations.

Presently, the head of the village is Nana Janjgava (2015-).

Geography
The village is partly mountainous.  The Chanistskali River flows through the village.

Population
As of 2014, the village has a population of 2,345.  
Narazeni residents speak Mengrelian, Georgian, Russian and a little bit English.

Facilities
In the village there are three schools, a kindergarten, ambulance, police, and a few shops.  During the Soviet period a newspaper in the Megrelian language called "Narazenish Chai" was published in the village.

Notable citizens

Eleonora Archaia - (b. 1967) is a Georgian politician and Businesswoman, who is a member of Kutaisi City Assembly.

See also
 Samegrelo-Zemo Svaneti

Populated places in Samegrelo-Zemo Svaneti